Infame (Infamous) is the seventh album by Argentine rock group Babasónicos.

Track listing
 "Irresponsables" (Irresponsible Ones) - 2:36
 "Risa" (Laughter) - 3:07
 "Pistero" (Song Jockey) - 2:58
 "Estertor" (Death Rattle) - 3:03
 "Putita" (Little Whore) - 3:45
 "Suturno" (Yourturn) - 3:53
 "Mareo" (Dizziness) - 3:32
 "Sin Mi Diablo" (Without My Devil) - 3:01
 "Curtis" - 3:27
 "Y Qué" (So What) - 3:07
 "La Puntita" (The Tip) - 3:13
 "Fan de Scorpions" (Scorpions Fan) - 2:15
 "Gratis" (Free) - 3:05
 "Once" - 2:33

Singles
 "Irresponsables"
 "Putita"
 "Risa"
 "Y Qué"

Sales and certifications

References

2003 albums
Babasónicos albums